Warid Telecom International was an Emirati  telecommunications company which was active in Bangladesh, Georgia, Congo, Pakistan, and Uganda before its divestment.

Pakistan

In 2004, Warid Telecom International LLC, purchased a license for operating a nationwide mobile telephony network, (WLL) and long-distance international (LDI) for $291 million US dollars and was the first venture of Warid Telecom International LLC.  The licence was bid for and acquired by a team led by Bashir Tahir the former CEO of the Abu Dhabi Group, which is the parent company of all Warid operations.

Warid Pakistan launched its services in May 2005. Within 80 days of launch Warid Pakistan claims to have attracted more than 1 million. users.

On June 30, 2007, Singapore Telecommunications Limited (SingTel) and Warid Telecom announced that they have entered into a definitive agreement subsequent to which SingTel will acquire a 30 percent equity stake in Warid Telecom for an estimated $758 million, valuing the company at an enterprise value of $2.9 billion.

SingTel sold back that stake in January 2013 for $150 million and a right to receive 7.5 per cent of the net proceeds from any future sale, public offering, or merger of Warid.

On November 26, 2015 VimpelCom and Abu Dhabi Group agreed to merge Mobilink and Warid into a single company called  Jazz.

Network technology

Bangladesh

In December 2005, Warid Telecom International LLC obtained a 15-year GSM license to operate as the sixth mobile phone operator in Bangladesh for US$50 million. Warid Bangladesh started rolling out its network from mid-2006, and launched commercial operations on May 10, 2007, covering 26 districts. It uses the code 16 preceded by the code number of Bangladesh +880. Warid Bangladesh has acquired a million subscribers within 70 days of launch.

Warid Telecom sold 70% of its stake in Bangladesh operations to India's Bharti Airtel for US$300 million receiving regulatory approval from the Bangladesh Telecommunication Regulatory Commission (BTRC) on January 4, 2010.

On December 20, 2010, Warid Telecom was rebranded as Airtel.

Georgia
Licence awarded.

Network technology

Ivory Coast

Licence awarded.

Republic of Congo

Launched service in January 2008. On 5 November 2013, The Wall Street Journal reported an acquisition by Airtel.

Network technology

Uganda

Planned to launch services in Uganda by the fourth quarter of 2007. Warid is also set to deploy a WiMAX network throughout Uganda through its sister concern Wateen Telecom. Acquired by Airtel in 2013.

Network Technology

References

External links
 Warid Telecom, Pakistan

 
Telecommunications companies established in 2004
Companies disestablished in 2015
Emirati companies established in 2004
2015 disestablishments in the United Arab Emirates